Nesbitt is a community located in the Municipality of Oakland – Wawanesa, Manitoba, Canada. It was established in 1891 by the Canadian Pacific Railway. Former NHL player Aaron Rome was born and raised here.

References 

Unincorporated communities in Westman Region
1891 establishments in Manitoba
Populated places established in 1891